DC Showcase: Green Arrow is a 2010 short animated film, directed by Joaquim Dos Santos and written by Greg Weisman, featuring Neal McDonough as Green Arrow, who must protect a young princess at an airport.

The short is considered by Weisman to be adjacent to the Young Justice cartoon, meaning a version of this event happened within the show's continuity. In 2022, the back-up story of Young Justice: Targets shows the canon version of this event, which has differences to the short.

Plot
Oliver Queen waits outside Star City international airport for the arrival of his girlfriend, Dinah. He is delayed in traffic due to the arrival of Princess Perdita.
 
Count Vertigo has hired Merlyn to assassinate Perdita, who is Vertigo's niece. Perdita will soon become queen of Vlatava following her father's assassination by her uncle. As Merlyn attacks his target, Queen discovers the plan and is forced to intervene as his alter ego Green Arrow. He dispatches several of Merlyn's henchmen before getting Perdita to a place of safety. He is forced to duel Merlyn himself, and defeats him.

Count Vertigo arrives and attempts to kill both the hero and Perdita himself, incapacitating them. Dinah, revealed to be Black Canary, arrives at that moment and knocks Count Vertigo unconscious with her sonic "Canary Cry". Afterwards, Arrow proposes marriage to Black Canary. Urged by a supportive Perdita, Dinah accepts Oliver's proposal and they share a passionate kiss.

Cast
 Neal McDonough as Green Arrow / Oliver Queen
 Malcolm McDowell as Merlyn
 Steve Blum as Count Vertigo
 Grey DeLisle as Black Canary / Dinah Laurel Lance
 John DiMaggio as Merc #1
 Ariel Winter as Princess Perdita

References

External links

 
 

Green Arrow in other media
2010 animated films
2010 short films
American direct-to-video films
Warner Bros. direct-to-video films
Green Arrow
2010 direct-to-video films
2010s American animated films
2010s direct-to-video animated superhero films
Animated superhero films
Black Canary
Warner Bros. Animation animated short films
2010s Warner Bros. animated short films
Films directed by Joaquim Dos Santos
2010s English-language films
American superhero films
Warner Bros. direct-to-video animated films
American animated short films